Quiet Storms: Romances for Flute and Harp is a 1988 New Age album by Michael Hoppé.

Track listing

References

1988 albums